Japan participated at the 2018 Asian Para Games in Jakarta, Indonesia from 6 to 13 October 2018. Its delegation was composed of 303 athletes. Athletes from Japan achieved a total of 198 medals (including 45 gold), and finished fourth at the medal table behind China, South Korea, and Iran.

Medals by sport

See also
 Japan at the 2018 Asian Games

References 

Nations at the 2018 Asian Para Games
Japan at the Asian Para Games
2018 in Japanese sport